"Pheng Xat Lao" ("Song of the Lao People") is the national anthem of the Lao People's Democratic Republic. It was written and composed in 1941 by Thongdy Sounthonevichit. It was adopted as the national anthem of the Kingdom of Laos in 1945. The original lyrics were revised after the Communists triumphed in the Laotian Civil War and established the Lao People's Democratic Republic in 1975, with the new lyrics written by Sisana Sisane.

History
Long a tributary state of Siam, in 1893 Laos became a protectorate of France within its colonial empire. The French claimed their annexation was to protect Laos from "hostile neighbors" such as China and especially Siam, which had been militarily forced to cede Laos to the European colonial power. In reality, France simply ruled Laos as a colony, even bringing in many Vietnamese to work in its governing. The transferring of control from one master to another meant that nationalist sentiment did not develop as it did in formerly independent Vietnam. However, the outbreak of the Second World War soon saw the fall of France to Nazi Germany. The new right-wing government in Siam saw this as a possible opportunity to regain formerly Thai territory lost to France, especially the land located on the Thai side of the Mekong River. To counteract this, the French colonial government began promoting Lao nationalism.

Because of this liberalization, many patriotic songs were now composed, each one emphasizing Lao "uniqueness". "Pheng Xat Lao" was one of them, having been composed by Dr. Thongdy Sounthonevichit in 1941 with lyrics written by Maha Phoumi under the name "Lao Hak Xat" (the patiotic Laos). It was chosen as the national anthem in 1945, when the king was forced by the Japanese occupiers to declare Laos independent from French rule. This new freedom was short-lived, since France quickly regained control of French Indochina after Japan's surrender in 1945. In 1947, France granted limited autonomy to Laos within the French Union, and "Pheng Xat Lao" again became the national anthem.

When the Pathet Lao emerged victorious in the Laotian Civil War in 1975, thanks to major North Vietnamese assistance, the new Communist government abolished the monarchy and changed the lyrics to reflect the ideology of the Marxist government.  As a result, the anthem became all-encompassing, mentioning all ethnic groups in Laos, instead of focussing on the Lao race and Buddhism. However, the melody was retained.

Lyrics

Current lyrics

Original lyrics (1947–1975)

Notes

References

External links
 
 
 Michael Sauser and Gilbert Greeve - Sauser and Greeve sing the anthem on their CD "Hymnen der Welt:  Asien"
 "Pheng Xat Lao" at empas.com
Dookola Swiata - This travel website has an instrumental version of the Anthem, as an .asx file.

Laotian music
National anthems
National symbols of Laos
1941 songs
Asian anthems
National anthem compositions in F major